Milieudefensie v Royal Dutch Shell (2021) is a human rights law and tort law case heard by the district court of The Hague in the Netherlands in 2021 related to efforts by several NGO's to curtail carbon dioxide emissions by multinational corporations. It was brought by the Dutch branch of Friends of the Earth and a group of other NGO's against the oil corporation, Shell plc. In May 2021, the court ordered Shell to reduce its global carbon emissions from its 2019 levels by 45% by 2030, relating not only to the emissions from its operations, but also those from the products it sells. It is considered to be the first major climate change litigation ruling against a corporation.

Facts
Following the global adoption of the Paris Agreement in 2016, which aimed to limit the rise in the global average temperature to under 1.5°C through various milestones at 2050, large corporations operating in signatory countries began evaluating if they could alter operations to meet the targets of the Agreement. The British multinational Shell is one of the largest oil and gas companies in the world; its headquarters are in the United Kingdom since 2022. Shell is the ninth-largest corporate contributor to global pollution, producing about 2.5% of global emissions. As the Paris Agreement was being developed, Shell evaluated its businesses to determine what it could do to address emissions, but had stated in 2014 that it believed that the Paris targets were unattainable and did not plan to change its business model away from oil and gas. Following the signing of the Agreement, Shell issued a statement that it would address its CO2 emissions, releasing a plan that called for reductions of its carbon dioxide emissions by 30% by 2035, compared to 2016 levels, and by 65% by 2050.So far, in 2022 only 1,5 % of the investments of Shell are to be used for renewables (wind and solar power generation), and with current investment trends Shell´s carbon emissions are expected to rise with 4% up to 2030 compared to 2019 levels

In order to safeguard the temperature limit set out in the Paris Agreement, global carbon emissions to decrease with 45% in 2030. Given the clear gap between Shell´s plans and the targets of the Paris Agreement, seven environmental organisations foundations – Milieudefensie (the Dutch branch of Friends of the Earth), Greenpeace, Fossielvrij, Waddenvereniging, Both ENDS, Jongeren Milieu Actief, and ActionAid – and 17,379 individual claimants in the Netherlands filed a class-action lawsuit against Shell in April 2019, arguing that Shell should change its business model to reach an emissions reduction target of 45% by 2030 in line with the Paris Agreement. By failing to change, the plaintiffs argued, Shell had failed to uphold the unwritten duty of care laid down in Book 6 Section 162 of the Burgerlijk Wetboek (Dutch Civil Code) as well as articles 2 and 8 of the European Convention on Human Rights. Shell stated in response to the summons that it was doing its part to address climate change, and that "What will accelerate the energy transition is effective policy, investment in technology and changing customer behaviour. None of which will be achieved with this court action. Addressing a challenge this big requires a collaborative and global approach."

Hearings at the district court at The Hague were held in December 2020. The plaintiffs were required under Dutch law to demonstrate that a viable alternative business model existed for Shell to achieve the suggested 45% reduction goal, and had used the recent transformation of Danish company Ørsted from fossil fuels to renewables as a viable example. During the trial, Shell issued a pledge in February 2021 to be net-zero by 2050. Plaintiffs considered Shell's pledge to be inadequate as the company would still fail to meet the Paris Agreement goals.

Judgment
The Hague District Court orderd that Shell's current sustainability policy was insufficiently "concrete", and that its emissions were greater than that of most countries. Due to these factors, the court ordered that Shell must indeed reduce its global emissions by 45% by 2030 compared to 2019 levels; the reduction targets include emissions from its operations and products. The court declared the order provisionally enforceable, meaning that the order has immediate effect, even if one of the parties appeals the ruling.

Significance
The case was considered a landmark ruling in environmental law related to climate change: while previous lawsuits against governments have prevailed for enforcing a more effective climate policy, this was considered the first major lawsuit to hold a corporation to the tenets of the Paris Agreement. As such, it contributes to the growing field of climate litigation. While the decision only has jurisdiction in the Netherlands, although pertaining to Shell´s global operations, it could set a precedent for other environmental lawsuits against other large companies with high emissions that have not taken sufficient steps to reduce their emissions. The impact of the court's decision was considered by legal experts to be strengthened due to its reliance on human rights standards and international measures on climate change.

Shell appealled the ruling. The hearings of the appeal case are not yet scheduled.

After losing in the Hague District Court, Shell dropped "Royal Dutch" from its name, and moved its headquarters to London. It said the choice was not due to losing the case.

See also 
State of the Netherlands v. Urgenda Foundation
EU law

Notes

External links
Case judgment in Dutch

2021 in case law
2021 in the Netherlands
Carbon emissions in the European Union
Climate change in the European Union
Climate change litigation
Dutch case law
Climate justice
2021 in the environment